Donald Trent Jacobs, also known as "Wahinkpe Topa," a Lakota term translating as Four Arrows, (born 1946) is an American college professor, writer and activist for American Indian rights whose work has focused on Indigenous worldviews, wellness and counter-hegemonic education. He lives in Mexico.

Early life and education
Jacobs has a bachelor's degree from Southwest Missouri State University, an Ed.D. from Boise State University, and a Ph.D from Columbia Pacific University.

Jacobs self-identifies as Cherokee, Irish and possibly [Creek] based on family stories.

Career
Jacobs is a faculty member in the School of Educational Leadership for Change at Fielding Graduate University.

He was formerly a tenured associate professor at Northern Arizona University and prior to that Dean of Education at Oglala Lakota College on the Pine Ridge Indian Reservation in South Dakota. In 2014 he was put on the International Fulbright Scholars list. In 2004 he received the Moral Courage Award from the Martin Springer Institute at Northern Arizona University for his activism. In 2009, the American Education Resource Organization selected him as one of "27 visionaries in education" for their text, Turning Points.

Works
Jacobson has written and published 23 books and numerous articles and invited book chapters, including:
 Four Arrows and Darcia Narvaez (2022) Restoring the Kinship Worldview. NAB/Penguin/Random House 
 Four Arrows (2020) Sitting Bulls Words for a World in Crises, DIO Press
 Four Arrows (2016) Point of Departure: Returning to Our Authentic Worldview for Education and Survival. Information Age Publishing
 Four Arrows (2013) Teaching Truly: A Curriculum to Indigenize Mainstream Education. New York: Peter Lang
 Four Arrows (2011) Differing Worldviews in Higher Education: Two Disagreeing Scholars Argue Cooperatively about Justice Education. Netherlands: Sense Publishers
 Four Arrows (2011). Last Song of the Whales. Maui, Hawaii: Savant Press
 Four Arrows, aka Jacobs, D.T. and Cajete, G. (2010), Critical Neurophilosophy and Indigenous Wisdom. Netherlands: Sense Publishers
 Four Arrows, aka Jacobs, D.T. (2008) The Authentic Dissertation: Alternative Ways of Knowing, Research and Representation. London: Routledge
 Four Arrows. (2006) The Shrimp Habit: How it is Destroying Our World. Victoria: Trafford.
 Four Arrows, aka Jacobs, D.T. Ed., (2006) Unlearning the Language of Conquest: Scholars Challenge Anti-Indianism in America. Austin: University of Texas Press. 
 Four Arrows and Fetzer, J. (2004) American Assassination: The Strange Death of Senator Paul Wellstone. New York: Vox Pop.
 Jacobs, D. and Jacobs-Spencer, J. (2001) Teaching Virtues: Building Character Across the Curriculum. Landham, Md.: Scarecrow Education Press, a division of Rowman and Littlefield.
 Jacobs, D. (1997) Primal Awareness: A True Story of Survival, Transformation and Awakening with the Raramuri Shamans of Mexico. Rochester, Vt.: Inner Traditions International. 
 Jacobs, D. (1994 ) The Bum’s Rush: The Selling of Environmental Backlash. Boise, Id.: Legendary Publishing.
 Jacobs, D. (1988) Patient Communication for First Responders: The First Hour of Trauma. Englewood Cliffs, N.J.: Prentice-Hall.
 Jacobs, D. (1988) Physical Fitness Programs for Public Safety Employees, 2nd edition, Boston: NFPA.

References

External links
Official website

Living people
1946 births
American people of Cherokee descent
American people of Muscogee descent
American people of Scotch-Irish descent
People from St. Louis
Columbia Pacific University alumni
Southeast Missouri State University alumni
Boise State University alumni